Nafferton is a village and civil parish in the East Riding of Yorkshire, England.

The village is served by Nafferton railway station on the Yorkshire Coast Line from Hull to Scarborough. According to the 2011 UK Census, Nafferton parish had a population of 2,433, an increase on the 2001 UK Census figure of 2,184.

History
Archaeological evidence for settlement in the area dates back to the mesolithic.  Early hunter-gatherers established temporary camp sites throughout the area, subsisting from woodlands foraging, deer, boars, bears, and wild cattle.
The nearby Yorkshire Wolds were later the site of substantial human activity during the neolithic and the area features burial mounds, with frequent finds of lithic technology.

According to A Dictionary of British Place Names the name Nafferton probably derives from "Nattfari", an Old Norse person name, with "tun", the Old English word for a farmstead or enclosure.

Nafferton is listed in the Domesday Book as "Nadfartone". At the time of the survey the settlement was in the Hundred of Torbar, and the East Riding of Yorkshire. There were 6½ households, 13 villagers, 17½ ploughlands, a meadow, and a mill. In 1066 Karli son of Karli held the Lordship, this had transferred by 1086 to William of Percy, who also became Tenant-in-chief to King William I. A second Domesday entry for Nafferton shows Bark as a further 1066 Lord, whose land and authority had been taken in entirety by William I. 

In 1823 Nafferton was a parish in the Wapentake of Dickering. The ecclesiastical parish was under the patronage of the Archbishop of York. A Methodist and an Independent chapel, and a small endowed school existed. Population at the time was 917. Occupations included sixteen farmers & yeomen, two blacksmiths, four bricklayers and one brick maker, two carpenters, six grocers, five shoemakers, three tailors, two drapers, an earthenware dealer, a gardener, a plumber & glazier, a horse dealer, a cabinet maker, a rope & twine and a linen manufacturer, a schoolmaster, and the landlords of The Bell, The Cross Keys, The King's Head, and The white Horse public houses. Residents included the parish curate and two gentlemen. A Hull to Scarborough coach was routed through Nafferton "during the bathing season". A carrier operated between the village and Driffield, and Bridlington, once a week.

The oldest surviving building in the village is the church, parts of which date from the 13th century. The church dedicated to All Saints was designated a Grade I listed building in 1966 and is now recorded in the National Heritage List for England, maintained by Historic England. Its best-known vicar was the parson-naturalist Francis Orpen Morris (1810–1893), author of highly successful books on birds, butterflies and moths.

The Mere, a large expanse of water fed by natural springs, was formerly a mill pond. The mere is drained via sluice gates into a mill race running through private gardens.  The race feeds a non-functioning but still existing wood and steel overshot waterwheel. The mill race drains into Nafferton Beck, and subsequently into the River Hull

Transport

Nafferton has bus and train services. Nafferton railway station has regular train services to Bridlington, Beverley and Hull with several running through to Scarborough, Doncaster, Meadowhall and Sheffield. Nafferton also has buses to Beverley, Hull, Bridlington, Scarborough and York (EYMS 121, 45/46, 270).

References

External links

 The Villages of the Yorkshire Wolds : Nafferton
 Nafferton village parish council web site
 Local School - Nafferton Primary School

Villages in the East Riding of Yorkshire
Civil parishes in the East Riding of Yorkshire